Acourtia is a genus of flowering plants in the family Asteraceae and was first described as a genus in 1830. It includes desertpeonies, such as Acourtia nana (dwarf desertpeony) and Acourtia runcinata (featherleaf desertpeony).

The genus name of Acourtia is in honour of Mary Elizabeth Catherine Gibbs à Court-Repington (1792–1878), an English noblewoman with botanical interests, who married Charles Ashe à Court-Repington.

Plants in this genus are native to the Southwestern United States (from Arizona, California, Nevada, New Mexico, Utah to Texas) and Mesoamerica (in Belize, El Salvador, Guatemala, Honduras and Mexico). They are diverse in appearance. The flowers are usually white, pink, or purple. Their flower heads are usually composed of only disc florets, though some are long and look like ray florets.

Accepted species
81 species (as of January 2022),

References

External links
 Jepson Manual Treatment
 USDA Plants Profile

Nassauvieae
Asteraceae genera
Flora of North America
Plants described in 1830